Aranyer Din Ratri (English: Days and Nights in the Forest) is an Indian Bengali adventure drama film released in 1970, written and directed by Satyajit Ray. It is based upon the Bengali novel of the same name by Sunil Gangopadhyay. It employs the literary technique of the carnivalesque. The film was nominated for the Golden Bear for Best Film at the 20th Berlin International Film Festival. A sequel Abar Aranye directed by Goutam Ghose was released in 2003.

Plot
The plot of the movie goes back to a similar outing the writer Sunil Gangopadhyay took in the early days of his poetic career. The story unfolds around a group of four friends, who despite their differences, bonded deeply. The four friends are all educated and come from different layers of society, but the urge to escape from the daily grind of city life forces them to wander in tribal lands.

Of the four friends, Asim, the leader of the pack, owns the car they drive in, has a cushy job, likes the company of girls and yet is very conscious of how he should be perceived by them. Sanjoy is a labour executive but would ideally want to immerse himself in literature.  Hari, a frank and straightforward cricketer, wants to forget the girl who dumped him. Shekhar is the jester, the only one without a job. He has a roving eye but stays sober when his friends get drunk and vent their frustrations.
They set out for the tribal Palamau, in Bihar. They had read legends about this land, the tribal women who are open, simple and beautiful.  Wanting to break rules, they forcefully stay at a forest rest house by bribing the chowkidar. The stay symbolizes their distance from city life and civilization: they wonder whether to shave or not. Hari gets close to tribal Santhal girl Duli when she approaches the group for extra drink.

Their resolve to be unshaven collapses when Shekhar sees two ladies Aparna and her sister-in-law Jaya in the forest. They introduce themselves to their family. The two urban groups of people are almost relieved to find each other here. Asim flirts with Aparna and coaxes her to show her room. He is attracted to the elegant and enigmatic Aparna, but is unable to keep pace with her composure, presence of mind and intelligence. At night the four friends go to drink alcohol again in the country liquor house. Hari is upset because he cannot see Duli whom he had met previous night. While returning to their rest house, they stumble upon a car which they shout at without realising it is that of Aparna and Jaya. They oversleep and miss the next day's breakfast at Jaya's place. They find a tiffin outside their rooms and go to Aparna's house to return it. Later, the conservator visits the forest rest house and catches them staying at the Forest Bungalow without permission. When they are about to be kicked out, Aparna, the conservator's acquaintance, manages the situation with her natural grace and composure. The group decides to chat and play a game while Aparna's father is away with Jaya's son. The game reaches a crescendo, with only Asim and Aparna left in the fray, at which point Aparna pulls out, deliberately handing victory to Asim, who seems to have placed his entire confidence at stake on the win.

The tensions peak at the village fair where the four friends go their own way. Shekhar goes off to gamble with money borrowed from Asim. Hari takes Duli into the forest and has sex with her. Asim feels his pride and self-confidence shattered when Aparna reveals her more vulnerable side that lies behind her composed exterior. She also holds up a mirror to his bourgeois and urban insensitivity by pointing out how despite having spent three days at the bungalow, he and his friends never bothered to inquire about the chowkidar's wife. Meanwhile, Shekhar finds himself helping all his friends (especially Hari, when the latter gets injured and robbed), despite being fondly considered to be the buffoon of the gang. Sanjoy, held back by his bourgeois moralities, is unable to respond to Jaya's bold advances.
The next morning, the four friends, leave for Calcutta since their new friends have had to return in a hurry. As a parting gift, they find a can of boiled eggs sent by the thoughtful Jaya.

Cast
Soumitra Chatterjee as Ashim
Subhendu Chatterjee as Sanjoy
Samit Bhanja as Hari
Rabi Ghosh as Shekhar
Pahari Sanyal as Sadashiv Tripathi
Sharmila Tagore as Aparna
Kaberi Bose as Jaya
Simi Garewal as Duli
Aparna Sen as Hari's former lover

Reception
Critics praised it heavily worldwide. After watching the movie Pauline Kael in the 'New Yorker' felt that "Satyajit Ray’s films can give rise to a more complex feeling of happiness in me than the work of any other director.... No artist has done more than Ray to make us reevaluate the commonplace." Again in 'Reeling' Kael further added: "A major film by one of the great film artists, starring Soumitra Chatterjee and the incomparably graceful Sharmila Tagore." David Robinson wrote in 'Financial Times'- "... every word and gesture is recognizable, comprehensible, true ... Ray's work at its best, like this, has an extraordinary rightness in every aspect of its selection and presentation - the timing, performance, cutting, music - which seem to place it beyond discussion." Jonathan Rosenbaum, in his list of '1000 ESSENTIAL FILMS', kept this film as one of his favourite films released in 1970. The New York Times described the film
as a ‘rare, wistful movie that somehow proves it’s good to be alive.’ British film critic Tom Milne praised the film writing “Ray gradually distils a magical world of absolute stasis: a shimmering summer’s day, a tranquil forest clearing, the two women strolling in a shady avenue, wistful yearnings as love and the need for love echo plangently… Beautifully shot and acted, it’s probably Ray’s masterpiece.”

References

External links

 (SatyajitRay.org) Aranyer Din Ratri
 

1970 films
1970 drama films
Bengali-language Indian films
Indian drama films
Indian black-and-white films
Films based on Indian novels
Indian buddy films
Films set in Bihar
Films directed by Satyajit Ray
Films with screenplays by Satyajit Ray
1970s Bengali-language films
Films based on works by Sunil Gangopadhyay